Weston and Ingestre railway station was a former British railway station opened by the North Staffordshire Railway to serve the village of Ingestre in Staffordshire in 1849.

Nearby was the Ingestre and Weston station opened by the Stafford and Uttoxeter Railway in 1867.

It closed in January 1947.

References

Further reading

Disused railway stations in Staffordshire
Former North Staffordshire Railway stations
Railway stations in Great Britain opened in 1849
Railway stations in Great Britain closed in 1947